Pornic Agglo Pays de Retz is a French agglomeration community, created on 1 January 2017 and located in the Loire-Atlantique department and the Pays de la Loire region.

Historical
After several months of negotiations, the community advisers of the two community of communes of Pornic and Cœur Pays de Retz decided to merge them on 13 June 2016  within an urban community called "Pornic Agglo Pays de Retz".

The agglomeration community was created on 1 January 2017 by prefectural decree of 9 November 2016.
On 5 January 2017, during its inaugural meeting, the community council elected the mayor of Pornic, Jean-Michel Brard, as president of the agglomeration community.

Community territory

Geography

Composition

The agglomeration community includes 15 municipalities:

Demography

Administration

Seat
The headquarters of the urban community is in Pornic, 2 rue du Docteur Ange Guépin.

Political trends

Community council
The 42 permanent advisers are thus distributed according to common law as follows:

Elections
 
The agglomeration community is administered by its  made up in 2020 of 42 community councillors, who are municipal councillors representing each of the member municipalities.

Following the 2020 municipal elections in Loire-Atlantique, the community council of 9 July 2020 re-elected its president, Jean-Michel Brard, mayor of Pornic, as well as its 9 vice-presidents. As of this date, the list of vice-presidents is as follows:

With 13 other elected officials, they form the community office for the period 2020-2026.

List of Presidents

Powers
The intercommunality exercises the powers which have been transferred to it by the member municipalities, under the conditions defined by the general code of local authorities .

Tax regime and budget
The agglomeration community is a public establishment of inter-municipal cooperation with its own tax system.

In order to finance the exercise of its powers, the intercommunality collects the single professional tax [ 3 ] (FPU) - which succeeded the single professional tax (TPU) - and ensures an equalization of resources between the residential municipalities and those with of activity zones.

Workforce
In order to implement its obligations, the inter-municipal association employs 200 agents.

Notes

References

External links
 

Pornic
Agglomeration communities in France
Intercommunalities of Loire-Atlantique
2017 establishments in France